The Seven Deaths of Evelyn Hardcastle (published in United States as The 7½ Deaths of Evelyn Hardcastle) is a novel by Stuart Turton which won the Best First Novel prize in the 2018 Costa Book Awards and reached number one on The Saturday Times Bestseller list  and number five on The Sunday Times Bestseller list.

It was published in the UK by Raven Books on 8 February 2018 and in the US by Sourcebooks Landmark on 28 September 2018 It has been translated into 28 languages, sold over 200,000 copies in the UK, and television rights have been optioned. In December 2020, Netflix announced that a seven-episode series was in production in the UK. In January 2023, it was reported that Netflix scrapped the project.

Plot
At the start of the book, the novel's protagonist awakes in a forest, suffering from memory loss, and calling for someone named Anna. He doesn't remember his own name. He finds his way to a manor, where his friends tell him that he is a doctor called Sebastian Bell who is attending a party thrown by the Hardcastles, the family of Blackheath Manor. After he falls asleep that night, however, he awakes to find himself in the body of the butler, and it is the morning of the previous day.

He learns that he has eight days, and eight different incarnations, to solve the murder of Evelyn Hardcastle, which will take place at 11pm at the party that evening. He will only be allowed to leave Blackheath once he finds the killer. If he is unable to solve the mystery in the eight allocated days, the process will start again and he will awake again in the body of Sebastian Bell with his memory wiped. He also learns that there are two other people competing to find out the murderer, and that only one person will be permitted to leave Blackheath.

Characters
The following characters are referenced in the book, in order of appearance.

Major characters:
 Aidan Bishop: the main character that wakes up every day in the body of a different guest from Blackheath house
 Sebastian Bell: medical doctor
 Anna: who has been presumably murdered
 The Footman: an unnamed stalker of Aidan's bodies
 Roger Collins: butler at Blackheath house, with a burnt face
 Daniel Coleridge: the 'Samaritan', a professional gambler
 Dr. Richard "Dickie" Acker: medical doctor
 Ted Stanwin: blackmailer in his fifties
 Michael Hardcastle: brother to Evelyn and Thomas Hardcastle, friend of Sebastian
 The Plague Doctor
 Evelyn Hardcastle: sister to Thomas and Michael Hardcastle 
 Lord Cecil Ravencourt: fat banker
 Gregory Gold: artist in residence
 Donald Davies: brother to Grace Davies
 Charles Cunningham: valet to Lord Ravencourt
 Jonathan Derby: son to Millicent Derby
 Edward Dance: solicitor
 Jim Rashton: police constable

Minor characters:
 Lucy Harper: first maid
 Thomas Hardcastle: brother to Evelyn and Michael Hardcastle
 Charlie Carver: groundskeeper
 Helena Hardcastle: Peter Hardcastle's wife and mother of Evelyn, Thomas, and Michael Hardcastle
 Madeline Aubert: Evelyn Hardcastle's French maid
 Mrs. Drudge: long-time cook at Blackheath house
 Millicent Derby: mother of Jonathan Derby
 Clifford Herrington: naval officer (retired)
 Peter Hardcastle: Helena's husband
 Phillip Sutcliffe: lawyer
 Christopher Pettigrew: lawyer
 Alf Miller: long-time stable master
 Grace Davies: sister to Donald Davies

Novel's structure 
The novel has similar characteristics to an Agatha Christie novel, with precise clues scattered in (almost) every chapter and a murderer to be identified. The endpapers of the book show a detailed plan of the villa and the lands around it; there is also a list of all the characters. It is structured in sixty chapters.

When the identity of the protagonist changes, the day on which it takes place is recorded at the beginning of the chapter. The incarnations are:
 day one: Sebastian Bell
 day two: Roger Collins
 day three: Donald Davies
 day four: Lord Cecil Ravencourt
 day five: Jonathan Derby
 day six: Edward Dance
 day seven: Jim Rashton
 day eight: Gregory Gold

Although the novel refers to different days (first, second, etc), the day in which the plot takes place is always the same: only the protagonist, changing identity, has the feeling of different days, so he has the opportunity to remember what he did in the shoes of his previous incarnations and to make different choices, changing the course of events. It is not explained how the protagonist can pass from one incarnation to another: it is said that the reconstruction of the mansion and of the Hardcastle crimes are a sort of virtual prison where the perpetrators of very serious crimes are imprisoned, but that the protagonist ended up there of his own free will for a precise reason (which he will have to discover, since his memory becomes weaker every time it overlaps with that of the characters whose personalities he takes possession of). The Plague Doctor, who is evidently part of the "staff" of the virtual prison, explains to him that there are thousands of other similar prisons, with different "scripts" but always focused on solving puzzles. The person who solves the riddle of his or her prison will be granted freedom; the other two competitors will have their memories erased and repeat the same day in a loop. It is also mentioned that the cycle has been repeating for decades and that the order of Bishop's incarnations has been changed several times. It is up to the reader to imagine an explanation, from the purely dreamlike/fantastic to the dystopian/fantasy-scientific.

Title 
According to Turton, the novel's title was changed in America since it was similar to the previously published The Seven Husbands of Evelyn Hugo.

Reception 
The Seven Deaths of Evelyn Hardcastle reached number one on The Saturday Times Bestseller list and number five on The Sunday Times Bestseller list, earning critical acclaim.

The Guardian'''s review said "With time loops, body swaps and a psychopathic footman, this is a dazzling take on the murder mystery", while The Times said "The plot of this complex, fascinating and bewildering murder-mystery is impossible to summarise" and called it "an astonishingly polished debut".

 Awards The Seven Deaths of Evelyn Hardcastle won the Best First Novel prize in the 2018 Costa Book Awards and Best Novel in the 2018 Books Are My Bag Readers' Awards, as voted for by booksellers. In the same year, it was shortlisted for a New Writers' Award at the Specsavers National Book Awards, Debut of the Year at The British Book Awards,  and longlisted for a New Blood Dagger and Gold Dagger at the CWA Awards. Val McDermid selected Stuart Turton, author of The Seven Deaths of Evelyn Hardcastle'', to appear on her prestigious New Blood panel at the Theakstons Old Peculiar Crime Writing Festival. In 2019, it was shortlisted for Best Debut Novel at the Strand Magazine Critics Awards and longlisted for The Glass Bell Award.

Adaptation
In December 2020 it was announced that Netflix had bought the rights to a seven-part series adaptation of the novel produced by House Productions, who had acquired the television rights in 2018, to be written by Sophie Petzal. On January 17, 2023, it was reported that after 2 years of development, Netflix had cancelled the planned series.

References

2018 British novels
Novels set in the 1920s
British mystery novels
British novels adapted into television shows